Sagot Kita Mula Ulo Hanggang Paa is a 2000 Philippine action comedy film written and directed by Felix E. Dalay. The film stars Jinggoy Estrada and Vina Morales.

Cast
 Jinggoy Estrada as Ador
 Vina Morales as Ma. Cecilia
 Joko Diaz as Butch
 Dick Israel as Bong
 George Javier as Elvis
 Perla Bautista as Maring
 Berting Labra as Kapitan
 Noreen Aguas as Nadia
 Conrad Poe as Madam X
 Vic Felipe as Mr. Wang
 Dianne Perez as Kapitan's Daughter

References

External links

2000 films
2000 action comedy films
Filipino-language films
Philippine action films
Maverick Films films
Films directed by Felix Dalay